"It's America" is a song written by Brett James and Angelo Petraglia and recorded by American country music singer Rodney Atkins. It was released in November 2008 as the first single and title track from Atkin's 2009 album of the same name.

Content
"It's America" is an up-tempo, backed by banjo, in which the narrator lists off various American images before saying that he is proud to live in the United States. The first verse describes his stopping at a lemonade stand and considering the stand a "picture-perfect postcard", while in the second verse, he describes watching a news story about people voluntary gathering to rebuild their community after a tornado.

Critical reception
Matt Bjorke of Roughstock gave the song a mixed review. Bjorke called it "a song that aims to reaffirm what made Rodney Atkins a star". He added that although the message was good, the song's production did not fit Atkins' voice and detracted from the lyric.

Chart performance
"It's America" debuted at #57 on the Hot Country Songs chart dated November 29, 2008, and entered the Top 40 in its third chart week. The song became his fifth Number One on the chart dated May 2, 2009.

Year-end charts

References

2008 singles
2008 songs
Rodney Atkins songs
American patriotic songs
Songs written by Brett James
Songs written by Angelo Petraglia
Curb Records singles